Carlos Humberto González Rolón (born March 11, 1977) is a retired Mexican football player and current manager of Pumas Tabasco. Gonzalez was born in Guadalajara, he played as a defender.

Honours
 Mexican Primera División: (1)
Pumas UNAM
  Clausura 2009

External links
 

1977 births
Living people
Footballers from Guadalajara, Jalisco
Mexican footballers
Association football defenders
Atlas F.C. footballers
Atlético Morelia players
Club Universidad Nacional footballers